Bottling is an action where a concert audience throws various objects at the performers onstage. This generally happens at festivals when one act in the lineup is of a different genre or audience from the rest of the bands, especially festivals where the majority of bands are related to heavy metal and punk rock music styles.

While bottling generally involves empty or full bottles of water, it is also common for bottles to contain urine. Other items, such as garden furniture, mud, fireworks, broken glass, shoes, dead animals, and molotov cocktails (unlighted and lighted), have also been recorded as thrown items.

Bottling incidents

Bottling incidents in fiction
The title characters were bottled in a pivotal scene in The Blues Brothers, famously only protected by a mesh of chicken wire.

References

 Lester Bangs. "Iggy Pop: Blowtorch in Bondage," in Psychotic Reactions and Carburetor Dung, ed. Greil Marcus (New York: Anchor Books, 1987), 206–207.  .

Abuse
Human communication